Sinclairs Bay is a large remote, breast shaped, or left leaf of a tear drop shaped, coastal embayment, on the east coast of Scotland, in east Caithness, in the district of the east Highlands. Its coastline falls entirely within the Scottish council area of Highland.

Geography
Starting in the north, at Ness Head, the bay is bounded by Freswick Bay, and overlooked by Skirza Head, the bay proper sweeps south in a long elliptical curve, before sweeping east to pass the remains Castle Sinclair and terminating at Noss Head Lighthouse.

Sinclairs Bay has two primary geological features. Starting at the coastal village of Keiss, running northeast, a stony beach and coastal crags, become cliffs that are increasingly sheer the further north. South of Keiss, the cliffs even out in a large white sandy beach, called Keiss Beach, forming large Dunes of Reiss Beach further south. At Ackergill Tower, the beach again becomes stony and eventually forms into a series of cliffs and crags, further east.

References

Caithness
Bays of Highland (council area)
Bays of Caithness